Nuevo Ideal is a city in the state of Durango, Mexico. In the 1920s, a population of Mennonite immigrants, originating from Canada, settled in the area. As of 2020, Nuevo Ideal had a population of 12,850. The city is located on the eastern slopes of the Sierra Madre Occidental.

References

Durango